Cutaneous Pasteurella hemolytica infections may occur in patients with skin injury and exposure Pasteurella hemolytica.

See also 
 Skin lesion

References 

Bacterium-related cutaneous conditions